The 1997 season was the 92nd season of competitive football in Norway.

Men's football

League season

Promotion and relegation

Tippeligaen

1. divisjon

2. divisjon

3. divisjon

Norwegian Cup

Final

Women's football

League season

Toppserien

Norwegian Women's Cup

Final
Trondheims-Ørn 6–1 Klepp

UEFA competitions

UEFA Champions League

Qualifying rounds

Second qualifying round

|}

Group stage

Group D

UEFA Cup Winners' Cup

First round

|}

Second round

|}

UEFA Cup

Qualifying round

First qualifying round

|}

Second qualifying round

|}

First round

|}

Intertoto Cup

Group stage

Group 5

Group 8

National teams

Norway men's national football team

Source:

Results

Norway women's national football team

Results

References

External links
  Norge Menn Senior A, Football Association of Norway 1908–present
 RSSSF.no – National team 1997

 
Seasons in Norwegian football